Wellingham is a village and civil parish in the English county of Norfolk.
At the 2011 Census the population remained less than 100 and was included in the civil parish of Weasenham All Saints. For the purposes of local government, it falls within the district of Breckland.

The villages name origin is uncertain, 'homestead/village at Welling (= spring/stream place)' or perhaps, 'homestead/village of the Wellingas (= dwellers at the spring/stream)'.

Notes

External links

Breckland District
Villages in Norfolk
Civil parishes in Norfolk